The Theotokos of Tolga is a Russian Orthodox icon representing the Virgin Mary (Theotokos) with the infant Jesus Christ. The Theotokos of Tolga, named after the Tolga river in Yaroslavl, is known in three copies created between the end of the 13th and the beginning of the 14th century. They were drawn in Eleusa type. One of them, traditionally called a "Manifested" icon, was manifested to Prokhor, the Bishop of Rostov in 1314.

The icon version of the end of 13th-century (Throne icon or Tolgskaya I) is held in the Tretyakov Gallery, while the Manifested one (also known as Tolgskaya II) is in the Tolga Monastery. Tolgskaya III was created circa 1327. It is currently held in the Russian Museum.

Theotokos of Tolga is referred to as the patroness of the Yaroslavl land.

References

External links
 
 Theotokos of Tolga at the Pravoslavie.ru (in Russian).

Yaroslavl
Tolga
Paintings of the Madonna and Child
Icons of the Tretyakov Gallery
13th-century Christianity
13th-century paintings
14th-century paintings
13th-century Eastern Orthodoxy